Gluphisia avimacula, the four-spotted gluphisium or avimacula pebble, is a species of moth in the family Notodontidae (the prominents). It was first described by George H. Hudson in 1891 and it is found in North America.

References

Further reading

 
 
 

Notodontidae
Articles created by Qbugbot
Moths described in 1891